The Garlock Building, at 522 Mount Rushmore Rd. in Custer, South Dakota, was built in 1890  It was listed on the National Register of Historic Places in 2004.

It is Early Commercial in style.

It was built by Thomas Van Der Vort Garlock, who came to Custer in 1884.  He had the two-story brick building constructed to replace a building burnt in a fire in 1890.  It first housed a grocery store and a bank on the first floor, and a lodgehall/ballroom on the second.  In 1909 the second floor was converted to apartments.

References

		
National Register of Historic Places in Custer County, South Dakota
Early Commercial architecture in the United States
Buildings and structures completed in 1890